In textual criticism, Christian interpolation generally refers to textual insertion and textual damage to Jewish and pagan source texts during Christian scribal transmission.

Old Testament pseudepigrapha
Notable examples among the body of texts known as Old Testament pseudepigrapha include the disputed authenticity of Similitudes of Enoch and 4 Ezra which in the form transmitted by Christian scribal traditions contain arguably later Christian understanding of terms such as Son of Man. Other texts with significant Christian interpolation include the Testaments of the Twelve Patriarchs and the Sibylline Oracles.

Josephus

Notable disputed examples in the works of Josephus include Josephus' sections on John the Baptist and James the Just which is widely accepted, and the Testimonium Flavianum, which is widely regarded as at best damaged.

See also
 Interpolation (manuscripts)

References

Biblical criticism
Textual scholarship